Bogović (pl. Bogovići) is a Serbo-Croatian surname, derived from the word bog, meaning "God". It may refer to:

Mirko Bogović (1816-1893), a Croatian poet and politician.
Davorin Bogović, Croatian rock vocalist, former member of Prljavo kazalište
Dušan Bogović, Serbian bass guitarist, member of Van Gogh
Erika Bogovic (born 1934), Austrian gymnast
Mile Bogović (1939-2020), Croatian Catholic bishop of Gospić-Senj
Mladen Bogović, Croatian footballer
I. Bogović, Serbian Orthodox canonist
Ivan Bogović, Croatian mayor
Simon Bogovič, Slovenian football player
Franc Bogovič (born 1963), Slovenian politician

See also 
Bogić
Bogovčić
Bogojević
Bogovići

Serbian surnames
Croatian surnames
Theophoric names

Slovene-language surnames